Below is a list of the governors of early California (1769–1850), before its admission as the 31st U.S. state. In 1822, following Mexican independence, California became part of Mexico.

That conflict ended in 1838, when the central government of Mexico recognized Alvarado as California Governor. The territorial  (legislature) approved the appointment.

Another disputed governorship occurred in 1844, settled when another Californio, Pio Pico, became the last Governor of Mexican California. In 1846, the "Bear Flag Revolt" in Sonoma declared California an independent republic—the "Bear Flag Republic". No government was formed, however, and the revolt did not have time to spread very far because California came under U.S. military occupation at the outset of the Mexican–American War less than a month later. California was ceded to the U.S. in 1848, and was admitted as the 31st U.S. state on September 9, 1850. Peter Burnett, the last governor of the post-war military territory, became its first state governor after admission.

Spanish rule (1769–1822) 
The Spanish Empire established its rule in the Californias in 1769. During this time, the Californias encompassed a massive territorial expanse, including both Alta California (present day U.S. state of California) and Baja California (present day Mexican states of Baja California and Baja California Sur), which were governed under a military administration led by the Governor of the Californias. In 1804, the Californias were officially divided into two administrations: Alta California, based in Monterey, and Baja California, based in Loreto.

Spanish governors of the Californias (1769–1804)
From 1769 to 1804, the Californias were governed as one administrative unit within the Spanish Empire. Following 1804, Alta California and Baja California each had their own administration.

Spanish governors of Alta California (1804–1822)
Following the division of the Californias in 1804, Alta California came to have its own administration. José Joaquín de Arrillaga, who had served as Governor of the Californias until 1804 subsequently served as the first governor of Alta California.

Mexican rule (1822–1846) 
Following the Mexican War of Independence from the Spanish, both of the Californias became part of the newly-independent Mexico in 1822. Mexican rule was interrupted from 1836 to 1838 by the Californio independence movement led by Juan Bautista Alvarado, who was acclaimed President of Alta California. However, Alvarado entered into negotiations with the Mexican government in 1838, which resulted in the disbandment of the Californio independence movement in favor of greater autonomy and the appointment of Alvarado as governor, thus reestablishing Mexican rule in Alta California, which lasted until 1846.

Mexican governors of Alta California (1822–1836)

President of Alta California (1836–1837)
Following the appointments of unpopular governors Gutiérrez and Chico, Juan Bautista Alvarado successfully led a popular uprising of Californios in 1836 which deposed Gutiérrez, proclaimed the independence of Alta California from Mexico, and named Alvarado as its president. Alvarado maintained effective control over California until he entered into negotiations with the Mexican central government in 1837, which resulted in the disbandment of Alta Californian independence in favor of greater autonomy from the Mexican government and recognition of Alvarado as Governor of Alta California.

Mexican governors of California (1837–46)
While Juan Bautista Alvarado maintained effective control as President of Alta California from 1836 to 1837, the Mexican central government appointed noted Californio statesman Carlos Antonio Carrillo as Governor of California to lead the nationalist offensive against Alvarado. As Carrillo was unsuccessful, Alvarado and the Mexican central government negotiated an end to the civil war in Alta California, resulting in Alvarado's abandonment of independence in favor of greater autonomy and the governorship, thus reestablishing the continuity of Mexican governance over Alta California.

American rule 
Following the American Conquest of California, forces part of the Pacific Squadron and California Battalion established U.S. military rule in California, beginning in 1846. Military governors ruled California until 1849, when efforts led by Bennet C. Riley led to the creation of the Constitution of California at the Constitutional Convention of Monterey and the establishment of civilian rule with the election of Peter Hardeman Burnett as the first Governor of California. Soon after, California was admitted as a state.

U.S. military governors of California (1846–1849)

See also 
Governor of California
List of governors of California since 1850
The Californias
Alta California

References

Bibliography

External links

01

Governors
California
Governors
.
Governors
Mexican California
.

es:Gobernadores de California antes de 1850#top